Computer Decisions was a computer industry monthly magazine published in the 1970s and 1980s.

In 1989 InformationWeek noted the loss to the industry of this and another competitor, Infosystems.

Collectors have described the magazine as being hardware-oriented and management-oriented; one issue ran over 10 pages on "Is there a shortage of computer programmers" in 1980. JSTOR listed them in a bibliography regarding computer ethics.

The magazine's name is included in lists of "published in" such as Columbia University's Graduate Alumni Magazine.

See also
 List of computer magazines

References

External links
 Archive, Computer Decisions magazine

Defunct computer magazines published in the United States
Magazines with year of disestablishment missing
Magazines with year of establishment missing
Monthly magazines published in the United States